Sre Pok Wildlife Sanctuary (formerly Mondulkiri Protected Forest) is a  large wildlife sanctuary in Mondulkiri Province, eastern Cambodia established on May 9, 2016, according to Sub-decree No. 85 ANKr.BK. 

It borders Lomphat Wildlife Sanctuary in the northwest, O'Yadav National Park in the north, Phnom Prich Wildlife Sanctuary in the southwest and Phnom Nam Lyr Wildlife Sanctuary in the southeast.

It is part of the largest protected area complex in Southeast Asia.

References

External 
 Tigers, Elephants Returning to War-Torn Cambodia Forest by National Geographic
 Mondulkiri Protected Forest and Phnom Prich Wildlife Sanctuary by IAPAD
 Map of Protected areas system in Cambodia

Wildlife sanctuaries of Cambodia
Protected areas of Cambodia
Protected areas established in 1999
Geography of Mondulkiri province
Forests of Cambodia